Gilling with Hartforth and Sedbury is a civil parish in North Yorkshire, England. It includes the villages of Gilling West and Hartforth. The civil parish population at the 2011 census was 534.

Governance
Gilling West remains the name of the  electoral ward. This ward stretches north west to Ravensworth with a total population taken at the 2011 census of 1,184.

References

Civil parishes in North Yorkshire